David Henry Richmond (born 1940 in Brighton, Sussex) is a professional bass player, best known as a founder member of the 1960s pop group Manfred Mann, playing with the band in 1963. After leaving the band in 1963, Richmond became a session player, working with, amongst others, Elton John, Bread, Hank Marvin and Serge Gainsbourg.

References

External links
 Jazz4now - The Dave Richmond Home Page

1930s births
Living people
People from Brighton
British rock bass guitarists
British double-bassists
Male double-bassists
Manfred Mann members
British rhythm and blues boom musicians
Year of birth uncertain
21st-century double-bassists